Félix Lengyel (born November 12, 1995), better known as xQc or by his former screenname xQcOW, is a Canadian Twitch streamer, internet personality, and former professional Overwatch player.

Lengyel began his esports career in 2016, while also regularly streaming. Most notably, he played for the Dallas Fuel in the Overwatch League inaugural season, before being released midway through the season due to repeated controversy and suspensions, as well as for Team Canada in the Overwatch World Cup from 2017 to 2019.

After leaving competitive Overwatch, Lengyel focused on a full-time streaming career on Twitch, while being a content creator for organizations such as Sentinels and Luminosity Gaming. Although he has been temporarily banned multiple times on the platform, he was the most watched streamer on Twitch in both 2020 and 2021.

Career

Early streaming 
Lengyel was streaming on Twitch when he was 19 years old, playing League of Legends (LoL), and streamed under the alias xQcLoL. The online alias of xQc came from the last letter of his first name, x, and the abbreviation of his home province Quebec, QC. With the release of Blizzard Entertainments video game Overwatch (OW) in 2016, Lengyel transitioned to mostly playing Blizzard's title; becoming so synonymous with the game, he changed his alias to xQcOW.

Esports 
Lengyel began his Overwatch esports career competing in small online tournaments as a tank player for teams such as DatZit Gaming. In October 2016, he was picked up by the multi-game esports organization Denial Esports. After a few months, Denial disbanded, and the former members of the team operated as an independent roster under the moniker Yikes, which was later changed to Arc 6. The team competed in Season Zero of Overwatch Contenders, which is when his competitive drive increased to an unhealthy level. "I did not care about sleeping or eating well, keeping up with friends or family," he said. "I would only turn my phone on before going to bed. If I performed poorly I would put everything aside and play ranked until I felt better about my play." Lengyel also played for Team Canada in their 2017 Overwatch World Cup campaign. He and the team reached the finals of the tournament, before being defeated by defending champions, South Korea. Despite losing the finals, Lengyel was named the event's most valuable player.

Lengyel was signed to the Dallas Fuel of the Overwatch League (OWL) in October 2017, ahead of the league's inaugural season. Prior to the start of the season, he received two suspensions on his personal Overwatch account from Blizzard. The first was a 72-hour suspension in November, after he misused the game's reporting system, and the second was a seven-day suspension in December after he threw games on stream. Lengyel's OWL debut came in the Fuel's first match of the season, on January 10, 2018, in a 1–2 loss to the Seoul Dynasty. Following team's third match of the season, a 0–4 loss to the Houston Outlaws on January 18, Lengyel made homophobic remarks on his personal Twitch stream towards Outlaws player Austin "Muma" Wilmot, who is openly gay. Lengyel apologized to Muma on Twitter later that day, stating that he did not mean to say anything with "malicious intent" and spoke "too fast." The Fuel responded to the incident by benching Lengyel in the following match, on January 19. That same day, the Overwatch League fined him $2,000 and suspended him for four matches. The Fuel then extended that suspension through February 10.

Lengyel's first match back from his suspension was on February 23, in 3–1 win over the Los Angeles Gladiators. However, his return did not last long, as he was fined $4,000 and suspended by the league for another four matches on March 10, after he used an emote in a "racially disparaging manner" during an Overwatch League stream and on his personal social media, as well as used "disparaging language" against Overwatch League broadcasters and players on his social media and personal stream. The following day, Lengyel was released from the team. In an interview with The Washington Post, Lengyel said that there were no racial undertones intended when he used the emote, and while he "did not feel like [he] did a mistake at all," he did regret using it because of how it was misconstrued. He went on to say that he enjoyed playing Overwatch professionally, but he was unsure if it was the career path he wanted continue to take.

Lengyel joined several Overwatch teams throughout the following years, including Overwatch Contenders teams GOATS and Gladiators Legion, as well as competed for Team Canada in the 2018 and 2019 Overwatch World Cups.

Return to full-time streaming 
After his release from Dallas Fuel in 2018, Lengyel focused mainly on his streaming career. In February 2019, esports organization Sentinels signed him as a content creator, and by May 2019, Lengyel became one of the most successful variety streamers on Twitch. According to Lengyel, he received a three-day ban from Twitch on July 30, 2019, for streaming a "sexually suggestive" video that briefly showed a penis; the ban came despite a Twitch employee permitting the video. However, a day later, he was unbanned. In December 2019, he was Twitch's most watched streamer, logging nearly eight million hours watched — over two million more hours than the second-most viewed channel of the month. On the year as a whole, he was the sixth-most watched streamer, with nearly 54million hours of watch time; over 14% of his watch time came from December alone.

Lengyel received another three-day ban on February 29, 2020, after he showed nudity in Strip 4: Classmate Study, an adult-themed game based on Connect Four. By default, all nudity in the game is censored, but he entered a code into the game that uncensored it, and the female character in the game had her breasts exposed. Twitch upheld the ban after he appealed. Following, the game was at the top of Steam "new and trending" list. Towards the end of March 2020, Lengyel started playing chess on stream, and in April, chess grandmaster Hikaru Nakamura began mentoring Lengyel. Twitch and Chess.com partnered to create the first edition of PogChamps, a chess tournament that occurred from June 5 to 19. Lengyel played in the tournament. In one of the matches, Lengyel faced Cr1TiKaL; Cr1TiKaL defeated him in just six moves. The match became the most-watched video on Chess.com's YouTube channel by May 2021, amassing over ten million views. Lengyel ultimately lost to Ludwig Ahgren in the consolation bracket semifinals. Lengyel received a 24-hour Twitch ban in the middle of PogChamps, on June 12, after he accidentally opened a video of two gorillas having sex that was submitted by one of his viewers. On August 27, 2020, Sentinels parted ways with Lengyel, after he requested to be released. He found a new organization on October 1, signing with Luminosity Gaming. On November 18, 2020, Lengyel was banned for seven days after he and his team stream sniped an opposing team in Fall Guys during a Twitch Rivals event, marking his fourth suspension from Twitch. He also received a six-month ban from Twitch Rivals and was forced to forfeit his prize winnings from the event. Despite his three bans in 2020, Lengyel had the highest watch hours at over 174million hours — nearly 50million more than the second-highest channel.

Midway through 2021, Lengyel led all streamers on Twitch in terms of viewership, with 163million hours watched, which was nearly double the second-largest channel. In June 2021, Lengyel moved back to Canada, stating that he was swatted multiple times, a problem that many Twitch streamers have had to deal with, and "was genuinely scared [he] was going to die." His earnings from the platform was leaked in October 2021, along with all of the top streamers on Twitch. The leak revealed that he was the highest-paid individual streamer, earning over $8million since 2019. Although accuracy of the leak has been questioned, Lengyel confirmed that his reported numbers were correct. With 274million hours watched in 2021, he was once again the most-watched streamer on Twitch. He also had a peak viewership of 173,000viewers, although it was well below the channel with the highest peak, which had 2.5million viewers.

In early April 2022, Lengyel took part in the r/Place social experiment, an online canvas in which registered Reddit users could edit by changing the color of a single pixel. After he had targeted a My Little Pony art piece, he said that he received more death threats in one hour than he had in his previous six years of streaming combined. Lengyel broke his Twitch viewership record during the event, peaking at over 293,000 viewers. He broke that record later that month while streaming a beta build of Overwatch 2, with a peak of over 312,000 viewers.

Personal life 
Lengyel was born on November 12, 1995, in Laval, Quebec, Canada. He is of Hungarian descent.

Awards and nominations

See also 
List of most-followed Twitch channels

Notes

References

External links

Living people
Canadian esports players
Dallas Fuel players
Denial Esports players
French Quebecers
Sportspeople from Laval, Quebec
Twitch (service) streamers
1995 births